Jew Suss: Rise and Fall (German title: Jud Süss – Film ohne Gewissen) is a 2010 German historical drama film directed by Oskar Roehler, dramatising the creative process behind the antisemitic Nazi propaganda film Jud Süß (1940). It was nominated for the Golden Bear at the 60th Berlin International Film Festival.

In Germany, the film premiered at the Berlin Film Festival and, mainly because of the controversial subject matter, received mixed reviews. Nevertheless, the German critics lauded the actor Tobias Moretti in his role as Ferdinand Marian. In 2011, cinematographer Carl-Friedrich Koschnick received the Austrian Romy award for cinematography.

Plot
When Ferdinand Marian's career is on the rise at the end of the 1930s, the Austrian actor is personally selected by the Propaganda Minister Joseph Goebbels for the title role in the feature film Jud Süß. Marian at first rejects the offer, but then succumbs to the temptation of a recognizing career. Whilst filming under director Veit Harlan, Marian begins to change, which leads to an argument with his Jewish wife, Anna. Jud Süß premieres at the Venice Film Festival at the beginning of September 1940 and opens in German cinemas a few days later. There, the anti-Semitic propaganda film reaches an audience of millions, and from then on Marian is identified as the role of the threatening-looking Jewish tax officer, Joseph Süß Oppenheimer, and he receives many deals to act in other films.

Now part of the German Reich, Marian gets to know the threat behind the National Socialists, which drove many of his professional colleagues into exile. The Jewish actor Wilhelm Adolf Deutscher, hidden in Marian's garden house and disguised as a gardener, is betrayed to his friend Lutz by the domestic servant Britta, with whom Marian apparently had an affair. Marian then takes solace drinking alcohol and cheats on his wife with a Czech woman named Vlasta. Joseph Goebbels deports Anna in order to gain control over Marian, but this causes an opposite effect.

As the Nazi regime falls at the end of the Second World War, Marian is not allowed to resume acting because of his involvement in Jud-Süß and the Nazis. At the same time, he has to watch many of his professional colleagues go into hiding and is confronted by the American military. Jud-Süß director Veit Harlan insists that he was forced to make the film. Marian then encounters his friend Wilhelm, who survived a Nazi concentration camp. Marian learns from Wilhelm of his wife's death. Finally, Marian discovers that Vlasta is having an affair with a U.S. soldier; this leads him to break down and commit suicide by car crash.

Historical accuracy
In the film Marian commits suicide by driving his car into a tree at high speed. According to Marian's biographer, Marian did die in his car, but it’s unclear whether the reason was suicide, drunkenness, or something else.

Cast
 Tobias Moretti as Ferdinand Marian
 Moritz Bleibtreu as Joseph Goebbels
 Martina Gedeck as Anna Marian
 Justus von Dohnányi as Veit Harlan
  as Wilhelm Adolf Deutscher
  as Knauf
 Anna Unterberger as Britta
 Milan Peschel as Werner Krauss
 Armin Rohde as Heinrich George
 Paula Kalenberg as Kristina Söderbaum
 Erika Marozsán as Vlasta
  as Fritz Hippler
 Robert Stadlober as Lutz
  as Malte Jäger
 Rolf Zacher as Erich Engel
 Waldemar Kobus as Eberhard Frowein
  as Magda Goebbels
 Johannes Silberschneider as Hans Moser

References

External links

2010 films
2010 drama films
2010s historical drama films
Films set in the 1940s
Films about films
Films about actors
Films about Nazi Germany
Films set in Berlin
Films set in 1939
Films set in 1940
Films directed by Oskar Roehler
Films scored by Martin Todsharow
Films shot in Cologne
German historical drama films
2010s German-language films
Cultural depictions of Joseph Goebbels
Biographical films about actors
2010s German films